This is the progression of world record improvements of the 200 metres M45 division of Masters athletics.

Key

References

Masters Athletics 200 m list

Masters athletics world record progressions